The 2008 Nevada Wolf Pack football team represented the University of Nevada, Reno during the 2008 NCAA Division I FBS football season. Nevada competed as a member of the Western Athletic Conference (WAC). The Wolf Pack were led by Chris Ault in his 24th overall and 5th straight season since taking over as head coach for the third time in 2004. They played their home games at Mackay Stadium.

Nevada utilized Ault's own creation, the "Pistol" offense. The offense was directed by offensive coordinator Chris Klenakis in his 15th overall and 8th straight season and defense was led by first–year defensive coordinator Nigel Burton.

Nevada finished the regular season with a 7–5 mark and 5–3 in WAC play, which resulted in a three-way tie for second-place in the conference. Hawaii and Louisiana Tech both likewise finished with 5–3 conference records. During the season, the Wolf Pack played three ranked teams: Texas Tech, Missouri and Boise State. Nevada lost each game, but gave Boise State its closest contest in conference play, losing by seven points. Nevada, however, suffered a setback when they lost to New Mexico State, who were called by one publication the "perennial WAC bottom feeders".

Quarterback Colin Kaepernick was named 2008 WAC Offensive Player of the Year. During the regular season, he passed for 2,479 yards and 19 touchdowns and rushed for 1,115 yards and 16 touchdowns. He was aided by running back Vai Taua, who ran for 1,420 yards and 14 touchdowns. It was the first time in school history that Nevada had two 1,000 yard rushers on the team simultaneously.

Nevada secured its fourth straight bowl game appearance and faced Maryland in the 2008 Humanitarian Bowl. The Wolf Pack lost in a high–scoring and record–setting game by 35 to 42.

Schedule

Game summaries

Grambling State

Texas Tech

at Missouri

at UNLV

at Idaho

New Mexico State

Utah State

at Hawaii

at Fresno State

San Jose State

Boise State

at Louisiana Tech

vs. Maryland

References

Nevada
Nevada Wolf Pack football seasons
Nevada Wolf Pack football